Murin is a Slavic male surname, its feminine counterpart is Murina. Notable people with the surname include:

 Gustáv Murín (born 1959), Slovak journalist
 Michal Murin (born 1963), Slovak artist
 Ondřej Murín (born 1991), Czech association football defender

Slavic-language surnames